Fotia may refer to:

 Fotia (album), an album by singer Anna Vissi
 Fotia (island), an uninhabited Greek islet in the Libyan Sea